Nancy Davenport (born 1965 in Vancouver, British Columbia) is a Canadian photographer. Her photography, animations and digital work have been exhibited at venues including the Liverpool Biennial, the Istanbul Biennial, the 25th Bienal de São Paulo, DHC/Art Fondation pour l’art Contemporain in Montreal and the First Triennial of Photography & Video at the International Center of Photography, NY.

Her work has appeared in October, Artforum, Art in America, ARTnews, and Flash Art. She is represented by Nicole Klagsbrun Gallery.

She is Assistant Professor of Fine Arts in the University of Pennsylvania School of Design, and she has also served as the Henry Wolf Chair at Cooper Union New York and has taught in the Master of Fine Arts programs at Bard, New York, the School of Visual Arts, New York, and Yale University.

She lives in New York City.

Awards
2009 Rome Prize

Exhibition
2011 Militarhistorisches Museum der Bundeswehr, Dresden, Germany
2010 Instituto Svizzero Roma
2009 Art Gallery of Windsor, Canada; LABoral, Gijón, Spain; Z33, Hasselt, Belgium
2008 Nicole Klagsbrun Gallery, New York; Liverpool Biennial International 08, Liverpool, UK; DHC/Art Fondation pour l’art Contemporain, Montréal; The Power Plant, Toronto
2007 10th International Istanbul Biennial, Istanbul, Turkey
2005 Mead Gallery, University of Warwick, Coventry, England
2004 Nicole Klagsbrun Gallery, New York; MIT List Arts Center -Media Wall, Cambridge, Mass.
2003 International Center of Photography, New York, NY; de Singel International Kunstcentrum, Antwerp
2002 Photo & Contemporary, Turin, Italy
2001 Nicole Klagsbrun Gallery, New York
2000     The Floating Gallery, Winnipeg, Canada
1999     Corchoran Gallery, NJCU
1998     Mercer Union, Toronto, Canada;            OR Gallery, Vancouver, Canada
1997     La Centrale, Montréal, Canada
1996     Linda Kirkland Gallery, New York
1995     Nicole Klagsbrun Gallery, New York
1994     Gracie Mansion Gallery, New York
1992     YYZ Artist's Outlet, Toronto, Canada

References

Bibliography 

 Nancy Davenport, Renovation, introduction by Reinaldo Laddaga (New York: Cabinet Books, 2016).

External links
Artist's website
"Openings: Nancy Davenport", ArtForum, Feb 2002, George Baker
"Nancy Davenport", Artnet

1965 births
Artists from Vancouver
Bard College faculty
Canadian expatriates in the United States
Canadian women photographers
Cooper Union faculty
Living people
University of Pennsylvania faculty